Erysimum deflexum, the  bent treacle mustard, is a herbaceous plant, a member of the family Brassicaceae.

Description 
The stems are  20 to 25 centimetres tall, and flowers are 1.5 to 2 centimetres across.

Distribution 
It is a native species to East Himalayas.

Taxonomy 
It was named by Joseph Dalton Hooker, and George Thomson, in J. Proc. Linn. Soc., Bot. 5: 165. in 1861.

References

External links 

 Isotype of Erysimum deflexum Cullen - family CRUCIFERAE
 http://flora.huh.harvard.edu/china/PDF/PDF08/ERYSIMUM.pdf

deflexum